"Love No More" is a song by Canadian DJ duo Loud Luxury and Canadian singer Anders. It was released as a single on August 31, 2018, by Armada Music. It was certified triple platinum in Canada by Music Canada and gold in Australia by the ARIA.

Background 
Digital Journal described the song as "upbeat and infectious" and having "killer bass and catchy synths, which make it pure ear candy". It received over one million streams in two days. Loud Luxury stated about the song "We are so excited about that. We have been watching the streams the entire day. It is so addicting." Broadway World called it a "a pop-laden punch mixed in with deep house booms", while Radio ZET described it as having "deadly bass and lots of contagious rhythms." Loud Luxury told Billboard that the song "feels like the perfect way to pick up the story where we left off."

Music video 
The official music video for the song was released on September 4, 2018. It was directed by Christopher Evans and is noted by Digital Journal to having a "carefree vibe". The video received over 4 million views on YouTube (as of October 2022).

Charts

Weekly charts

Year-end charts

Certifications

References 

2018 songs
Loud Luxury songs